The 1891 Nebraska Old Gold Knights football team represented the University of Nebraska in the 1891 college football season. The team had no head coach, but Theron Lyman led NU in preparation for its game against Iowa. The team played its single home game at Lincoln Park, in Lincoln, Nebraska.

Nebraska fielded its second football team in 1891. Although the university did not provide an official head coach, Iowa College coach Theron Lyman assisted Nebraska in preparation for its November 26 game against Iowa, in order to increase the competitiveness of NU's young program against the veteran Hawkeyes. However, Lyman likely did not even attend his single game as "head coach".

Nebraska's second victory over Doane gave the program a second straight unofficial Nebraska state championship. This was the final year Nebraska was known as the Old Gold Knights. They would later be referred to as the "Tree Planters", "Nebraskans", "The Rattlesnake Boys", "Red Stockings", and "Antelopes", but "Bugeaters" became the university's official nickname in 1892.

Schedule

Coaching staff

Roster

Starters

Game summaries

Doane (October)

Nebraska had planned a rematch with Doane during the 1890 season, which was never played, but led to the teams facing each other three times in 1891.

Although Doane scored the first points of the game (the first ever scored against Nebraska), Nebraska posted 16 unanswered points before halftime. The game was reportedly very physical, with several players suffering serious injuries, to the point that the Doane squad considered calling off the rest of the game, though they eventually agreed to a shortened 15-minute second half. Nebraska scored 12 more points to win 28-4.

at Doane (November)

Nebraska, hoping for more playing time before facing the established Iowa Hawkeyes, scheduled a rematch with Doane. Team captain Ebenezer Mockett withdrew from the university prior to the game, leaving the Old Gold Knights without a head coach or captain. Doane reportedly prepared at length for the game, while several Nebraska players remained out with injuries.

Nebraska scored the first points off an early Doane fumble to go ahead 6-0. Doane pulled ahead 10-6 at the beginning of the second half, NU's first-ever deficit.  Although the Old Gold Knights responded with six points to regain the lead, Doane responded to hand Nebraska the first loss in program history.

Iowa

Although Nebraska was supported by temporary head coach Theron Lyman, the Old Gold Knights' lack of experience and substandard equipment made NU heavy underdogs against the Hawkeyes. Despite having played just one more season than NU, Iowa use playing styles and strategies Nebraska had never seen before, such as pre-play signal calling by the quarterback. Despite a strong defensive effort by Nebraska, Iowa pulled away in the second half to win 22–0, Nebraska's first shutout loss.

at Doane (December)

After splitting two games, Nebraska and Doane arranged a tie-breaking third game to serve as an unofficial state championship game.

Despite losing a physical game to Iowa just one week prior, visiting Nebraska opened the first half with 22 unanswered points. NU halfbacks George Flippin, the first African American to play football for Nebraska, and James Johnston each scored three touchdowns. NU added ten points in the second half en route to a 32–0 victory and the unofficial Nebraska state championship for the second consecutive year.

References

Nebraska
Nebraska Cornhuskers football seasons
Nebraska Old Gold Knights football